Jesuit Bend is an unincorporated community in Plaquemines Parish, Louisiana, United States, on the West Bank of the Mississippi River.

History
Members of the Society of Jesus settled at this location in the early part of the 18th century, a bend in the Mississippi River, hence the name "Jesuit Bend".  The Jesuit settlers brought with them from Asia the satsuma, a loosely skinned seedless tangerine.  Satsumas have been farmed at this locale ever since.

At one point, Jesuit Bend had a station on the New Orleans, Fort Jackson & Grand Isle Railroad line. It also is the location of the Jesuit Bend Wetland Mitigation Bank, an effort to return open water to a fully functioning freshwater marsh, to help reverse the longstanding problem of wetlands erosion in the Mississippi River Delta.

Jesuit Bend Incident 
In October 1955, parishioners at St. Cecilia Church in Jesuit Bend stopped Father Gerald Lewis, an African American Catholic priest, from celebrating Mass because of his skin color.  Archbishop of New Orleans Joseph Francis Rummel placed the chapel under interdict. This lasted for two years before a priest, reportedly via subterfuge (promising to never again send a Black priest), obtained signatures from a number parishioners promising to accept any priest sent to them. Archbishop Rummel approved the chapel's reopening before eventually discovering the ruse, but he wished to save face and not renege on the order. The chapel was destroyed by a hurricane soon after, and it was never rebuilt.

References

Unincorporated communities in Plaquemines Parish, Louisiana
Unincorporated communities in Louisiana
Unincorporated communities in New Orleans metropolitan area
Louisiana populated places on the Mississippi River

Catholicism-related controversies